The 1995 Liverpool Victoria Charity Challenge was the inaugural edition of the professional invitational snooker tournament, which took place in January 1995. The tournament was played at the International Convention Centre in Birmingham, England, and featured sixteen professional players.

Stephen Hendry won the title, beating Dennis Taylor 9–1 in the final.


Main draw

References

Champions Cup (snooker)
1995 in snooker
1995 in English sport